The 1979 Hawaii Rainbow Warriors football team represented the University of Hawaii at Manoa in the 1979 NCAA Division I-A football season. Hawaii finished the 1979 season with a 6–5 record and a 3–3 in their first season of Western Athletic Conference (WAC) play. The warriors were led by third-year head coach Dick Tomey.

Schedule

References

Hawaii
Hawaii Rainbow Warriors football seasons
Hawaii Rainbow Warriors football